The Grumman FF "Fifi" (company designation G-5) was an American biplane fighter aircraft operated by the United States Navy during the 1930s. It was the first carrier aircraft with retractable landing gear. It was produced under licence in Canada and known as the Goblin in Canadian service and Delfín (English: "Dolphin") in Spanish service.

Design and development
The FF-1 was Grumman’s first complete aircraft design for the US Navy. The Navy had asked Grumman if their retractable landing gear made for the O2U-1 Scout planes could be retrofitted to the Navy's Boeing F4B-1 fighters; instead Grumman proposed a new fighter design. The prototype XFF-1 (serial number A8878) was built to a contract placed on 22 April 1931, first flying on 29 December of that year, a two-seat design, with an enclosed cockpit, fuselage of all-metal construction, and wings covered largely with fabric. The XFF-1 was powered initially by a 616 hp (459 kW) Wright R-1820-E Cyclone radial engine, it achieved 195 mph (314 km/h) during service trials.  Later the original engine was exchanged for a 750 hp (560 kW) Wright R-1820-F Cyclone and the XFF-1 reached a top speed of 201 mph (323 km/h), faster than any US Navy fighter in service at the time.

A production order was placed for 27 two-seat FF-1 (G-5) on 19 December 1932. Meanwhile, Grumman had completed a second prototype (serial number A8940) to a two-seat scout configuration as the XSF-1 (G-6). Subsequently, 33 production SF-1s were ordered based on the two-seat configuration. They differed from the FF-1 principally in having revised internal equipment and in being powered by R-1820-84 Cyclones instead of the R-1820-78 model installed in the fighter version. One XSF-2 was also completed, this having a Pratt & Whitney R-1830 Twin Wasp engine in place of the Cyclone.

The distinctive retractable main landing gear design for the FF-1 had originated with Grover Loening's employment of Grumman's future founder, Leroy Grumman, who had hired both Grumman and Jake Swirbul to work in his own aircraft firm in 1928 – after the Loening Aeronautical Engineering Company folded in the 1932–33 timeframe, Loening in turn contributed to the Grumman firm's later successes, with the Grumman-designed, manual crank-operated retractable main gear design used for a number of Loening's military aircraft designs being used on the FF-1, and later Grumman F2F and F3F follow-on biplane fighter designs; culminating in the Grumman F4F Wildcat also using it, as well as the amphibious single-engined Grumman JF and J2F Duck multi-use biplane military aircraft.

Operational history

FF-1s were delivered to Fighter Squadron VF-5B of the  beginning in June 1933. In service the FF-1 became familiarly known as the "Fifi". Delivery of SF-1s started on 30 March 1934, and they also served aboard the Lexington, with Scout Squadron VS-3B.

Both the FF-1 and SF-1 were withdrawn from first-line US Navy squadrons by the end of 1936 and reallocated to reserve units, with most of the FF-1s still being in service late in 1940. Later, 22 surviving FF-1s were modified with dual controls, redesignated FF-2s and used for instructional duties.

The Canadian Car and Foundry Co acquired a manufacturing licence for the G-23, an improved FF-1, of which it completed a total of 52, some of which were assembled from US-built components. Thirty-four were acquired by the Spanish Republican government in 1937 by presenting forged Turkish credentials. This batch was built primarily to bypass the US embargo placed on belligerents during the Spanish Civil War. Referred to as the GE-23 Delfin (en:'Dolphin') by the Spanish Republican Air Force, the aircraft fought in the conflict, but were outclassed by opposing fighters and losses were high. A victory against a Heinkel He 59B was the only recorded "kill" by a Grumman biplane fighter. Eleven survived to serve in the Ejército del Aire Español, nicknamed Pedro Rico for its rotundity.

Although initially rejected as a fighter by the Royal Canadian Air Force as outdated and too slow, with the advent of war, the last 15 of the CC&F production batch were taken on strength as Goblin Is. The aircraft type served with the RCAF from 17 September 1940 until 21 April 1942. "A" Flight of No. 118 RCAF Sqn was equipped with Goblins at Rockcliffe in Ottawa, and subsequently became No. 118 (Fighter) Sqn., later stationed at Dartmouth, Nova Scotia, where the Goblins for a time constituted the sole fighter force on the east coast.

Prior to RCAF use, single examples were delivered to Nicaragua, Japan, and Mexico.

The sole G-23 purchased by the Nicaraguan government saw limited service before being relegated to a scrap yard at Zololtan Air Field in 1942, destined to remain there until 1961 when it was purchased and shipped to the US. In 1966, Grumman restored the aircraft before passing it to the US Navy where it remains as one of the displays at the Naval Aviation Museum at Pensacola, Florida.

The Japanese example was purchased as an example of Grumman's undercarriage, however by the time it was delivered better designs were already in use.

The Mexican example was intended to be a pattern aircraft to allow a production line to be set up there but this never occurred.

Variants
XFF-1 single prototype, serial number A8878
FF-1 27 built, two-seat U.S. Navy carrier-borne fighter
FF-2 25 of the original FF-1 fighters converted by the Naval Aircraft Factory with dual controls to serve as fighter trainers
XSF-1 one built, second prototype, serial number A8940
SF-1 33 built, two-seat U.S. Navy carrier-borne scout
XSF-2 one aircraft, an SF-1 airframe with the 650 hp (485 kW) Pratt & Whitney R-1535-72 Twin Wasp Junior engine driving a Hamilton Standard propeller
Goblin 52 G-23s built under licence by the Canadian Car & Foundry Company
AXG1
A single Grumman G-23 supplied to the Imperial Japanese Navy Air Service for evaluation in 1935.
GE.23 Delfin
Export variant for Spain, 34-built.

Operators

Royal Canadian Air Force
No. 118 (Fighter) Squadron RCAF – 15 aircraft, designated Goblin I
No. 123 (Fighter) Squadron RCAF – 12 aircraft, designated Goblin I

Imperial Japanese Navy – one CC&F example designated AXG

Mexican Air Force – one intended as pattern for production in Mexico.

Military Aviation Corps – 1 example, serial GN-3
 Spanish Republic
Spanish Republican Air Force – 34 aircraft delivered serials AD-001 to AD-034
Ejército del Aire – 11 examples that survived the civil war.

United States Navy

Specifications (FF-1)

See also

References

Citations

Bibliography
 (in Spanish)

External links

 Grumman FF-1 'Fifi'
 Grumman FF – National Naval Aviation Museum

F01F
Grumman F0F
Single-engined tractor aircraft
Biplanes
Carrier-based aircraft
Aircraft first flown in 1931